Lieutenant-General Sir George Norton Cory, KBE, CB, DSO (26 December 1874 – 17 November 1968) was an American-born Canadian soldier who served with the British Army in India, South Africa and Canada and during the Boer War, World War I and World War II.

Education 
Cory was born in Evanston, Illinois, the son of a Canadian father, Charles Dickenson Cory, of Halifax, Nova Scotia, and American mother, Ella Agnes Norton. He was firstly enrolled at Bishop's College School in Quebec, Canada from 1889 to 1891 and attended their cadet corps. He entered military life when he entered the Royal Military College of Canada in Kingston, Ontario in 1891 while ranking fourth in the R.M.C. matrix and graduated in 1895.

Military service 

Cory was commissioned as a second lieutenant in the Royal Dublin Fusiliers on 28 August 1895, and promoted to lieutenant on 5 January 1897. He saw action in South Africa as adjutant with the Composite Regiment of Mounted Infantry during the Second Boer War for which he was appointed a companion of the Distinguished Service Order. Promotion to captain followed on 24 February 1900.

In the First World War he served with the British Expeditionary Force on the Western Front from 1914 to 1915 and then with in the British Salonika Force from 1915 to 1917. He was appointed a Companion of the Order of the Bath in the 1918 Birthday Honours.

After the war he became General Officer Commanding 27th Division in May 1919, Deputy Adjutant-General in India in 1921 and then Director of Personal Services in India later in that year. He went on to be Deputy Chief of the General Staff, India in 1922 and was appointed a Knight Commander of the Order of the British Empire in the 1925 Birthday Honours. He became General Officer Commanding 50th (Northumbrian) Division in 1927 before retiring in 1931.

At the start of the Second World War was recalled to service as Inspector & Chief Liaison Officer to Allied Contingents, working with Dutch, Danes, Poles, French and others across England, a post he took up in 1940. His service in Second World War was warmly recalled after his death in a letter to The Times:

He retired again in 1943.

References

Further reading

External links 
Generals of World War II

1874 births
1968 deaths
British Army lieutenant generals
People from Evanston, Illinois
Canadian people of American descent
Canadian Anglicans
Military personnel from Illinois
Canadian Companions of the Distinguished Service Order
Canadian Knights Commander of the Order of the British Empire
Canadian Knights Commander of the Order of the Bath
Royal Dublin Fusiliers officers
Bishop's College School alumni
British Army personnel of the Second Boer War
British Army generals of World War I
British Army generals of World War II
Royal Military College of Canada alumni
American emigrants to Canada
Expatriates of Canada in British India